Sixtus Armin Thon (10 November 1817, Eisenach - 26 September 1901, Weimar) was a German painter, etcher and lithographer. There is widespread disagreement over whether his name was Sixtus or Sixt, even though his gravestone says "Sixtus".

Life and work 
He was born to the naturalist and mineralogist, who was also an amateur engraver. In 1837, he studied painting at the Academy of Fine Arts, Leipzig, then transferred to the Weimar Princely Free Drawing School, where his primary instructor was Friedrich Preller the Elder.

He also took study trips to the Netherlands and Norway and completed his training at the Royal Academy of Fine Arts Antwerp. In the 1850s, he ran one of the first photography studios in Weimar.

In 1861, he became a teacher at his alma mater, the Drawing school. He served as the interim Director there in 1873. For a time, he also taught at the "Sophienstift", a school for girls established by Princess Sophie of the Netherlands. He was largely known for landscapes and genre scenes, but the etchings and lithographs he made for Die Gartenlaube and other publications are probably his most familiar works.

The municipal collection in Braunschweig possesses a large number of his original materials.

References

Further reading 
 Anton Bettelheim: Biographisches Jahrbuch und deutscher Nekrolog, Vol.6, G. Reimer, Berlin, 1904, pg.566.
 Anton Kippenberg, Goethe-Museum Düsseldorf, Anton-und-Katharina-Kippenberg-Stiftung: Jahrbuch der Sammlung Kippenberg, Vol.1, Insel-Verlag, Frankfurt am Main, 1963, pg.50.
 Walther Killy and Rudolf Vierhaus (Eds.): Deutsche Biographische Enzyklopädie. Vol.10, K.G. Saur Verlag GmbH & Co. KG, München 1996, pg.22.
 Axel Stefek: "Lichtbilder auf Papier. Weimars erste Fotografen: Sixt Armin Thon, Adelbert Schenk, Ludwig und Ignaz Frisch". In: Weimar-Jena. Die große Stadt. Das Kulturhistorische Archiv 7 (2014), pp. 297–311

External links 

 More works by Thon @ ArtNet

1817 births
1901 deaths
19th-century German painters
19th-century German male artists
German etchers
German lithographers
Royal Academy of Fine Arts (Antwerp) alumni
People from Eisenach